Alois Strohmayer (1822-1890) was an Austrian composer during the Romantic era and a member of the celebrated Schrammel Quartet.
He was the father of Anton Strohmayer, a famous Austrian guitarist.

Biography 
For much of the 20th century, many of Alois Strohmayer's 200+ compositions remained undiscovered, however they were re-discovered by a Viennese professor in 1971. Alois Strohmayer was born in Vienna in 1822 and began writing music at the age of just seventeen. Starting off writing only violin pieces, he soon turned to folk music ensembles with well-known musicians such as Georg Danzer and the Schrammel brothers in the form of Schrammelmusik. His compositions included waltzes, polkas, dances and marches with influence being drawn from Johann Strauss Sr., Josef Lanner and Schubert. He wrote primarily for an ensemble of two violins, bass guitar and woodwind instrument, flute or clarinet. He died at the age of 78 in 1890.

References

Literature 
http://www.biographien.ac.at/oebl_13/421.pdf

Austrian classical composers
1822 births
1890 deaths
19th-century classical composers
Musicians from Vienna
Austrian male classical composers
19th-century male musicians